Hilary Hemingway (born 1961) is an American author. She grew up in Miami Beach, and, as of 2016, lives on Cape Coral.

Many of her earlier published works were co-authored with her husband, Jeff Lindsay. She produced a 2002 documentary for PBS titled Hemingway in Cuba.

She is the daughter of Leicester Hemingway and niece of Ernest Hemingway.

In 2009, Hemingway co-wrote a feature screenplay with actor/director Andy Garcia, Hemingway & Fuentes; it follows Ernest Hemingway's friendship with Cuban Captain Gregorio Fuentes during the last ten years Ernest spent on the island of Cuba. The film was being produced by CineSon Productions. As of 2016, the film has not yet been made.

Bibliography

References

Living people
American women screenwriters
Screenwriters from Florida
1961 births
Hemingway family
Place of birth missing (living people)
21st-century American women writers
21st-century American screenwriters
20th-century American novelists
20th-century American women writers
American women novelists
Novelists from Florida
21st-century American non-fiction writers
American women non-fiction writers
People from Miami Beach, Florida
People from Cape Coral, Florida